Sche (pronounced ) was the
feminine,
third-person,
singular,
personal pronoun (subject case) in Middle English.